Anaphlystus or Anaphlystos was a coastal (paralia) deme of ancient Athens, belonging to the Antiochis phyle, on the west coast of Attica, opposite the island of Eleussa, and a little north of the promontory of Sunium, between that promontory and that of Astypalaea. It bordered on Aegilia to the west, to Atene in the south-east and to Amphitrope to the east. To the northwest, it was separated from Phrearrhioi by the Astike Hodos.

It was a place of some importance. It had ten representatives in the Boule. Xenophon recommended the erection of a fortress here for the protection of the mines of Sunium. Strabo speaks of a paneium (Πανεῖον), or Grotto of Pan, in the neighbourhood of Anaphlystus.

It was situated at a site called Agios Georgios (St. George), close to the modern settlement of Anavyssos, on the Athens Riviera.

References

Ancient Athens
Populated places in ancient Attica
Former populated places in Greece
Demoi